The 2005 season was the Chicago Bears' 86th in the National Football League (NFL). The team improved to an 11–5 record from a 5–11 record in 2004, earning them their first playoff birth and NFC North title since 2001 and the second seed in the NFC for the playoffs.

The season started off with the team trying to rebound from a 5–11 season under now coach Lovie Smith. Smith, in his first year with the Bears, had been eager to lead his young team to a Super Bowl, but a preseason injury to starting quarterback Rex Grossman spelled disaster for the Bears.

The 2005 Bears started the season slowly, winning only one of their first four games. Despite their poor passing game, the Bears managed to win eight consecutive games, through perseverance on defense and a solid running game. The Bears eventually clinched a playoff berth on Christmas Day against the Green Bay Packers. However, in their first playoff game in almost four years, the Carolina Panthers upset the Bears, 29–21.

This season is notable for Bears linebacker Brian Urlacher winning Defensive Player of the Year. He was the first Bear to earn the award since 1988 when Mike Singletary won.

Offseason

NFL Draft

Training camp
Hopeful expectations were crushed as quarterback Rex Grossman's ankle was broken in the 2nd preseason game against the St. Louis Rams. Backup quarterback Chad Hutchinson was benched and cut after struggling heavily in the next two preseason games against the Indianapolis Colts and Buffalo Bills. The Bears then turned to rookie Kyle Orton to lead their offense.

Rookie running back Cedric Benson held out of training camp over a contract dispute until just before the final preseason game. His absence in camp meant that Thomas Jones would be the starting running back going into the regular season.

Despite all these setbacks, the Bears were still hopeful because franchise middle linebacker Brian Urlacher had made it through the preseason in good health, unlike the year before when he battled injuries all season, beginning with a pulled hamstring on the first day of training camp.

Preseason

Staff

Roster

Regular season

Schedule

Standings

Game summaries

Week 1: at Washington Redskins

Week 2: vs. Detroit Lions

Week 3: vs. Cincinnati Bengals

This was Chicago's only loss at home during the season.

Week 5: at Cleveland Browns

Week 6: vs. Minnesota Vikings

Week 7: vs. Baltimore Ravens

Before the game, Bears great Walter Payton, who died in 1999, was honored by teammate Dan Hampton, who played together in the Bears' 1985 season.

Week 8: at Detroit Lions

Bears rookie Mark Bradley was placed on injured reserve this game, and was replaced by Justin Gage. Bradley had recorded 18 receptions for 230 yards at the time of his injury.

Week 9: at New Orleans Saints

Due to damage from Hurricane Katrina to the Louisiana Superdome, the Saints were forced to host the game at LSU's Tiger Stadium in Baton Rouge. The Saints scored first on a John Carney field goal, but the Bears struck back with a Kyle Orton to Justin Gage touchdown pass. After the Saints scored on an Aaron Brooks touchdown pass to Donté Stallworth, Robbie Gould tied the game on a 35-yard field goal. In the second half, Adrian Peterson gave the Bears the lead on a 6-yard run, which was countered with Brooks scoring on a 1-yard touchdown run in the fourth. Orton eventually threw a 22-yard pass to Muhsin Muhammad to set up a game-winning field goal from Gould with six seconds left in the game. Gould eventually scored on a 28-yard field goal to give the Bears a 20–17 lead. The Saints' last chance to march 65 yards to win was crushed when Brooks' pass to Az-Zahir Hakim was intercepted by Nathan Vasher. The win was the Bears' fourth-straight, which hasn't been accomplished by the team since their 2001 season. In the first quarter, Bears running back Thomas Jones went out with an injury, but his backups Adrian Peterson and Cedric Benson combined for 137 yards and a touchdown.

Week 10: vs. San Francisco 49ers

Week 11: vs. Carolina Panthers

Week 12: at Tampa Bay Buccaneers

Week 13: vs. Green Bay Packers

Week 14: at Pittsburgh Steelers

Week 15: vs. Atlanta Falcons

Week 16: at Green Bay Packers

The win marked the first time since 1991 that the Bears swept the Green Bay Packers.

Week 17: at Minnesota Vikings

Playoffs

NFC Divisional Playoff: vs. Carolina Panthers

The Bears hosted their first playoff game since the 2001 season against the red hot Panthers, fresh off a victory over Eli Manning and the New York Giants.

Things were bad from the beginning for the Bears, who allowed a 58-yard Jake Delhomme TD pass to Steve Smith just 55 seconds into the game. Cornerback Charles Tillman slipped on the play, and it only signified things to come the rest of the game for the vaunted Bears defense.

The Panthers added two field goals to their total before the Bears got their first points.

The Bears offense got off to a slow start, having their first 5 possessions end in punts. Their first score came midway through the second quarter, when running back Adrian Peterson scored a touchdown on a 1-yard run. The Bears had opted to go for it on 4th down to get the score, cutting the Carolina lead to 13–7. Before the half expired, the Panthers' John Kasay kicked a 37-yard field goal with 5 seconds left in the half, extending the lead to 16–7.

The Bears offense came out at halftime firing on all cylinders, mounting an 8-play, 68-yard drive to close to within 2 points of the Panther lead. It was a balanced drive that led to the score, with the Bears running and passing 5 times each, with Rex Grossman capping the drive with a 1-yard TD pass to Desmond Clark.

The spark provided by the offense was short-lived, as midway through the 3rd quarter, Delhomme went deep to Steve Smith again, this time for a 39-yard touchdown that put the Panthers up 23–14. Chris Thompson, a reserve defensive back for the Bears, fell down on the play to let Smith slip past him.

The Bears managed to score one more time on a drive that started with 2:07 remaining in the 3rd quarter. Grossman completed 3 of 4 passes on the drive, and running back Thomas Jones almost scored on a 7-yard run. After a replay challenge by Carolina, however, the officials reversed the call to say that Jones had fumbled into the endzone, which would have resulted in a Carolina touchback. However, a major facemask penalty on Carolina defensive back Marlon McCree gave Chicago a first down at the Carolina 3. From there, fullback Jason McKie rumbled in for a touchdown, making the score 23–21 to the Panthers.

The Panthers extended their lead once more with a 1-yard Delhomme pass to tight end Kris Mangum. Kasay missed the extra point try though, making the Panthers' lead 29–21.

When the Bears offense started moving the ball once more, disaster struck for the Bears, as on a 3rd-and-10 play from the Carolina 37-yard line, Grossman threw an ill-advised interception to Ken Lucas.

References

External links

 2005 Chicago Bears Season at www.bearshistory.com

Chicago Bears
Chicago Bears seasons
NFC North championship seasons
Bear
2000s in Chicago
2005 in Illinois